The Lowe Baronetcy, of Edgbaston in the City of Birmingham, is a title in the Baronetage of the United Kingdom. It was created on 30 January 1918 for Francis Lowe, Conservative Member of Parliament for Edgbaston from 1898 to 1929.

Lowe baronets, of Edgbaston (1918)
Sir Francis William Lowe, 1st Baronet (1852–1929)
Sir Francis Gordon Lowe, 2nd Baronet (1884–1972)
Sir Francis Reginald Gordon Lowe, 3rd Baronet (1931–1986)
Sir Thomas William Gordon Lowe, 4th Baronet (born 1963)

References

Lowe